Ewald Rudolf Weibel HonFRMS (5 March 1929 – 19 February 2019) was a Swiss anatomist and physiologist and former director of the Institute of Anatomy at the University of Bern.  He was one of the first scientists to describe the endothelial organelles Weibel–Palade bodies, which are named after him and his Romanian-American colleague George Emil Palade. He was known for his work on the anatomy of gas exchange in lungs on multiple spatial scales using stereology.

Education and career 
Weibel was born in Buchs in the Aargau canton of Switzerland. After studying medicine at the University of Zurich (state examination 1955, Dr. med. 1956), he spent several years studying in the USA at Yale University in New Haven, as well as at Columbia University and the Rockefeller Institute (now Rockefeller University) in New York, most recently as a career Investigator for the Health Research Council of the City of New York. In 1963 he returned to the Anatomical Institute of the University of Zurich as an assistant professor and in 1966 he was appointed full professor and director of the Anatomical Institute at the University of Bern until his retirement in 1994. He was Rector of the University of Bern from 1984 to 1985. From 1979 until 1996 he was Visiting Agassiz Professor and Associate in the Museum of Comparative Zoology at Harvard University. After his retirement, he was Vice President and Secretary of the Maurice E. Müller Foundation for Orthopedic Surgery until 2000. He was founding president of the Union of Swiss Societies for Experimental Biology (1969-1972), President of the Swiss Academy of Medical Sciences (1996-2000) and President of the International Union of Physiological Sciences (1997-2001).

His scientific work covered four main areas: the morphometry of the human lung as the structural basis of the gas exchange function; the development of morphometric and stereological methods; the application of these methods in cell biology to measure the membrane system of the liver cell and the mitochondria in the muscles; integrative studies in comparative physiology, particularly on the question of the optimal structural basis of the organismic functions of the respiratory system, from the lungs to the muscle cells and their mitochondria, based on the hypothesis of symmorphosis. The discovery of the Weibel-Palade bodies in 1962 was an accidental observation. Ewald Weibel was married to the violinist and musicologist Verena Weibel-Trachsler.

Honors and awards 
Weibel was awarded numerous awards and accolades in life, a selected list is in the following.
 1974: Marcel Benoist Prize
 1979: Honorary Fellow of the Royal Microscopical Society
 1979: Felix Fleischner Medal
 1981: Foreign Associate of the U.S. National Academy of Sciences
 1982: College Medalist, American College of Chest Physicians
 1985: Fellow of the American Association for the Advancement of Science
 1987: Anders Retzius Gold Medal, Karolinska Institutet, Stockholm
 1987: Member of the Royal Society of Sciences in Uppsala
 1988: H.R. Schinz Medal, Swiss Society of Radiology
 1988: Honorary Degree of Doctor of Science, University of Edinburgh
 1988: Member of the Polish Academy of Sciences
 1989: Member of the German Academy of Natural Scientists Leopoldina
 1992: Individual member of the Swiss Academy of Medical Sciences
 1993: Jan Evangelista Purkinje Gold Medal, Prague
 1998: Member of the Academia Europaea
 1999: Honorary Doctor of Medicine, University of Geneva
 1999: Honorary Foreign Member, American Academy of Arts and Sciences
 2000: Honorary member of the Swiss Academy of Sciences
 2004: Honorary member of the Swiss Academy of Medical Sciences
 2005: Prix La Recherche with Bernard Sapoval & Marcel Filoche, Paris
 2007: Educational Award, European Respiratory Society

Bibliography

References 

1929 births
2019 deaths
Foreign associates of the National Academy of Sciences
Swiss biologists
Fellows of the Royal Microscopical Society
University of Zurich alumni
Academic staff of the University of Bern
Rockefeller University people
People from Aargau
Fellows of the American Association for the Advancement of Science
Members of the Royal Society of Sciences in Uppsala
Members of the German Academy of Sciences Leopoldina
Members of the Polish Academy of Sciences
Columbia University people
Swiss anatomists